Blue Songs may refer to:

Blue Songs (album), a 2011 album by Hercules and Love Affair
 Blue Songs (film), a 1929 Paramount musical short film starring Ruth Etting